William P. Morrow House is a historic home located near Graham, Alamance County, North Carolina. It was built about 1855, and is a two-story, three bay, stuccoed brick dwelling in the Greek Revival style.  It has brick end chimneys and a low hipped roof. A -story rear ell was added in 1984–1985.

It was added to the National Register of Historic Places in 2006.

References

Houses on the National Register of Historic Places in North Carolina
Greek Revival houses in North Carolina
Houses completed in 1855
Houses in Alamance County, North Carolina
National Register of Historic Places in Alamance County, North Carolina